Dawg '90 is an all-instrumental album by American musician David Grisman, recorded with his group David Grisman Quintet in 1990. It is the first album released by Grisman's own label, Acoustic Disc.

In his Allmusic review, Ken Dryden stated: "Grisman's fascinating blend of elements of jazz, gypsy music, and bluegrass with additional influences help all ten compositions remain fresh after numerous hearings." The album was the first album for which Grisman received a Grammy nomination.

Track listing 
All songs by David Grisman
 "Pupville" – 3:12
 "Chili Dawg" – 5:35
 "Mad Max" – 3:31
 "O'Banion's Wake" – 4:42
 "Dawg Daze" – 5:02
 "'Lil Samba" – 6:27
 "Learned Pigs" – 3:45
 "Gypsy Nights" – 6:09
 "Hot Club Swing" – 4:27
 "Sativa" – 12:32

Personnel
David Grisman – mandolin
John Carlini – guitar
Matt Eakle – flute
Jim Kerwin – bass
Joe Craven – percussion, violin
Additional musicians:
Mark O'Connor – violin
Matt Glaser – violin

Chart positions

References

1990 albums
David Grisman albums
Acoustic Disc albums